Marietta Omarovna Chudakova (2 January 1937 – 21 November 2021) was a Soviet and Russian literary critic, historian, doctor of philological sciences, writer, and memoirist. She was the chairman of the All-Russian Bulgakov Foundation.

Early life and education
Chudakova was the fourth child in her family. Her father was Omar Kurbanovich Khan-Magomedov, an engineer and a native of Dagestan. Her mother was Klavdia Vasilyevna Makhova, a preschool teacher.

Chudakova graduated from Moscow School No. 367, then in 1959, the Faculty of Philology of Moscow State University. Her first works were published in 1958. From 1959 to 1961, she taught Russian language and literature in a Moscow school. In 1964, after completing graduate school, she defended her thesis for the degree of Candidate of Philology.

Career
She was chosen as Laureate of the Prize of the Moscow Komsomol in 1969. In 1970, she was inducted into the Union of Soviet Writers. Since 1991 she has been a member of Academia Europaea.

In October 1993, in connection with the dispersal of the Supreme Council, Chudakova signed the Letter of Forty-Two.

In 2007, she was included in the first three candidates of the party Union of Right Forces in the elections to the State Duma. The Union of Right Forces did not overcome the 5% barrier, receiving less than 1% of the votes. According to Chudakova, she was engaged in politics that year, because too few people take an active political position.

In April 2010, she signed an appeal by the Russian opposition Putin Must Go.

In 2014, she was one of 180 representatives of different professions who signed an open letter headlined  Do Not Cave In. Do Not Succumb to Lies  protesting the Russian annexation of Crimea.

She was the chairman of the All-Russian Bulgakov Foundation.

Personal life
She was married to the literary critic Alexander Chudakov and she has a daughter. Chudakova was diagnosed with COVID-19 in November 2021, and was taken to intensive care. She died on 21 November 2021.

References

External links
 Мариэтта Чудакова на сайте «Грани-ТВ»
 Мариэтта Чудакова в «Журнальном зале»
 Эхо Москвы: Выхода нет: Способствовали ли диссиденты развалу Союза?

1937 births
2021 deaths
Writers from Moscow
Soviet women writers
Soviet writers
Russian women writers
Soviet literary historians
Russian literary historians
Russian women historians
21st-century Russian writers
20th-century Russian writers
Russian memoirists
Moscow State University alumni
Union of Right Forces politicians
Deaths from the COVID-19 pandemic in Russia